Rajendra Laxmi Gaire is a Nepalese politician and party member of Communist Party of Nepal (Unified Marxist-Leninist). She is also member of Rastriya Sabha and was elected from 2022 Nepalese National Assembly election.

References

External links 
 सदस्यहरु

Living people
Nepalese politicians
Year of birth missing (living people)